The discography of American metalcore band Hatebreed consists of eight studio albums, one cover album, one video album, three extended plays, eight singles and eighteen music videos.

Albums

Studio albums

Cover albums

Video albums

Extended plays

Singles

Music videos

References

External links
 Official website
 Hatebreed at AllMusic
 

Heavy metal group discographies
Discographies of American artists